William Tecumseh Wilson (October 6, 1823 – June 5, 1905) was a Union Army officer during the American Civil War.

William Tecumseh Wilson was born in Huntingdon County, Pennsylvania on October 6, 1823. He served in the Mexican–American War. He was a newspaper editor.

He served as a captain in the 15th Ohio Infantry Regiment, April 23, 1861. He was mustered out of the volunteers on August 27, 1861. He was appointed lieutenant colonel of the 15th Ohio Infantry on September 12, 1861. He resigned that commission on  August 10, 1862. He was appointed lieutenant colonel of 123rd Ohio Infantry Regiment on September 9, 1862 and colonel of the regiment on September 26, 1862. Wilson was captured near the end of the war at the Battle of High Bridge on April 6, 1865. He was mustered out of the volunteers on June 12, 1865.

On January 13, 1866, President Andrew Johnson nominated Wilson for appointment to the grade of brevet brigadier general of volunteers, to rank from March 13, 1865, and the United States Senate confirmed the appointment on March 12, 1866.

William T. Wilson died on June 5, 1905 at Columbus, Ohio. He was buried at Green Lawn Cemetery (Columbus, Ohio).

See also

 List of American Civil War brevet generals (Union)

References

Union Army colonels
People of Ohio in the American Civil War
1823 births
1905 deaths
Burials at Green Lawn Cemetery (Columbus, Ohio)